Alfred Edmund Brehm  joins Johann Wilhelm von Müller on an expedition to Egypt, the Sudan, and the Sinai peninsula.
Death of Johann Conrad Susemihl
Death of Giuseppe Géné
René Primevère Lesson receives the Legion of Honour
Jean Louis Cabanis erects the genus Geothlypis in  Ornithologische Notizen. Archiv für Naturgeschichte 
William Henry Edwards publishes A Voyage Up the River Amazon, with a residency at Pará

Ongoing events
Fauna Japonica

Birding and ornithology by year
1847 in science